Brenner Alves Sabino (born 10 February 1999), commonly known as Brenner, is a Brazilian professional footballer who plays as a forward for PT Prachuap.

Career
On 13 August 2019 Danish 1st Division club Vejle Boldklub announced, that they had signed Brenner on a one-year loan deal with an option to buy. However, the club announced on 20 December 2019, that the deal had been terminated after having played only three games for the club.

Club Stats
Updated to January 1st, 2022.

References

External links

1999 births
Living people
Brazilian footballers
Brazilian expatriate footballers
Association football forwards
Sport Club Internacional players
Oeste Futebol Clube players
Vejle Boldklub players
Iwate Grulla Morioka players
Campeonato Brasileiro Série A players
Campeonato Brasileiro Série B players
Danish 1st Division players
J2 League players
J3 League players
Brazilian expatriate sportspeople in Denmark
Brazilian expatriate sportspeople in Japan
Expatriate men's footballers in Denmark
Expatriate footballers in Japan
Footballers from Porto Alegre